Ákos Kinyik (born 12 May 1993) is a Hungarian football player who plays for Paks.

Career

Debrecen
On 29 July 2017, Kinyik played his first match for Debrecen in a 1-1 drawn against Paks in the Hungarian League.

Career statistics

Club

References

External links

1993 births
Sportspeople from Debrecen
Living people
Hungarian footballers
Association football defenders
Debreceni VSC players
Létavértes SC players
Budaörsi SC footballers
Paksi FC players
Nemzeti Bajnokság I players
Nemzeti Bajnokság II players